Port of Menteith is a village and civil parish in the Stirling district of Scotland, the only significant settlement on the Lake of Menteith. It was established as a burgh of barony, then named simply Port, in 1457 by King James III of Scotland. It lies in the historic county and Registration County of Perthshire.

The village lies at the north-eastern edge of the Lake, at the junction of the A81 road with the B8034 road, which runs south, just to the west of Flanders Moss, to meet the A811 road at Arnprior. The country around is generally low-lying, except to the north where the Menteith Hills rise, including Beinn Dearg (426 m), with the Trossachs and the southern Highlands beyond. The Parish includes the outlying settlements of Cobleland, Dykehead, Gartmore and Ruskie.

In the summer months a ferry runs from Port of Menteith to the island of Inchmahome, site of the Historic Scotland-maintained Inchmahome Priory. The village is home to a fishing club and is the starting point for anglers on the Lake of Menteith. Nick Nairn's cookery school is based at Loch End, just south of Port of Menteith at the south-east corner of the Lake.

Nearby Rednock House, the home of retired IndyCar champion Dario Franchitti, is a historic Laird's House remodelled by the architect Robert Brown of Edinburgh in 1827. Its grounds include a walled garden, ice house and ornamental water garden.

Notes

External links

Scottish Places -  Historical perspective for Port of Menteith

Villages in Stirling (council area)